Tidarren is a genus of tangle-web spiders first described by Ralph Vary Chamberlin & Wilton Ivie in 1934.

Males are much smaller than females, and they amputate one of their palps before maturation, entering their adult life with only one palp. Though it is uncertain why they do this, it may be done to increase mobility, as the palps are disproportionately large compared to the size of the body. It may also be done because only one palp is needed.

Females of the Yemeni species T. argo tear off the single remaining palp before feeding on males. The palp remains attached to the female's epigynum for about four hours, continuing to function despite being separated from the male's body.

Species
 it contains twenty-four species:
Tidarren aethiops Knoflach & van Harten, 2006 — Congo
Tidarren afrum Knoflach & van Harten, 2006 — Cameroon, Uganda
Tidarren apartiolum Knoflach & van Harten, 2006 — Madagascar
Tidarren argo Knoflach & van Harten, 2001 — Yemen, Chad
Tidarren circe Knoflach & van Harten, 2006 — Namibia
Tidarren cuneolatum (Tullgren, 1910) — Cape Verde Is., Canary Is., Africa, Yemen
Tidarren dasyglossa Knoflach & van Harten, 2006 — Madagascar
Tidarren dentigerum Knoflach & van Harten, 2006 — Yemen
Tidarren ephemerum Knoflach & van Harten, 2006 — Madagascar
Tidarren gracile Knoflach & van Harten, 2006 — Yemen
Tidarren griswoldi Knoflach & van Harten, 2006 — Cameroon
Tidarren haemorrhoidale (Bertkau, 1880) — USA to Argentina
Tidarren horaki Knoflach & van Harten, 2006 — Madagascar
Tidarren konrad Knoflach & van Harten, 2006 — Yemen
Tidarren lanceolatum Knoflach & van Harten, 2006 — Congo
Tidarren levii Schmidt, 1957 — Congo
Tidarren mixtum (O. Pickard-Cambridge, 1896) — Mexico to Costa Rica
Tidarren obtusum Knoflach & van Harten, 2006 — Madagascar
Tidarren perplexum Knoflach & van Harten, 2006 — Cameroon, Congo
Tidarren scenicum (Thorell, 1899) — Cameroon, Guinea-Bissau, Ivory Coast, South Africa
Tidarren sheba Knoflach & van Harten, 2006 — Yemen
Tidarren sisyphoides (Walckenaer, 1841) — USA to Argentina, Caribbean
Tidarren ubickorum Knoflach & van Harten, 2006 — South Africa
Tidarren usambara Knoflach & van Harten, 2006 — Tanzania

References

External links

Theridiidae
Araneomorphae genera
Taxa named by Ralph Vary Chamberlin
Taxa named by Wilton Ivie